"Worthing Farm" is a short story by Orson Scott Card.  It appears in his short story collection The Worthing Saga.

Plot summary
Elijah, one of Jason Worthing’s descendants, lives at Worthing Farm with his wife and two sons.  Because there is a severe drought and nothing will grow, his wife wants to leave the farm.  Elijah believes that if he does, he will die from a curse.  When the wife tries to leave, he beats her up and then goes out to the field and wishes for rain.  To his surprise, rain comes. Unfortunately, there is too much and the farm is flooded.  Because he will be unable to repair the damage to the farmhouse before winter, Elijah packs up his family and takes them to his brother's new inn.  At the inn, he discovers that his nephew Peter has the same powers he has.

Connection to the Worthing Saga
This story takes place several years before the events in the story "Worthing Inn".  Orson Scott Card wrote a very different version of this story in chapter 9 of his novel The Worthing Chronicle.

See also
List of works by Orson Scott Card

External links
 The official Orson Scott Card website

Short stories by Orson Scott Card
1990 short stories